WEHP is a Christian radio station licensed to Clinton, Indiana, transmitting on 93.7 MHz. The station serves the Terre Haute, Indiana area, and is owned by American Hope Communications. The station began broadcasting in June 2000, and originally on 93.9 MHz. In 2011, the station's frequency was changed to 93.7 MHz. The station was taken off the air in March 2020.

WEHP was originally owned by Word Power, Inc. Effective October 29, 2021, it was sold to American Hope Communications, along with WKZI, WLHW, WPFR 1480 AM, and three translators, for $179,000.

References

External links

EHP
EHP
Moody Radio affiliate stations
Radio stations established in 2000
2000 establishments in Indiana